Mike Skinner (born June 28, 1957) is an American former stock car racing driver. He has competed in the NASCAR Sprint Cup Series, NASCAR Busch Series and NASCAR Camping World Truck Series. He has most recently driven the No. 98 Ford Fusion for Phil Parsons Racing in the Cup Series. He is the father of former NASCAR drivers Jamie Skinner and Dustin Skinner. He was born in Susanville, California.

Skinner appeared as the test driver for the first series of The Grand Tour. He was known as "The American," in humorous contrast to the main presenters, who are British.

Racing career

Early career 
Skinner began racing at Susanville Speedway in the 1970s in a Plymouth Road Runner and at various California dirt tracks, winning three championships. He soon moved to North Carolina and worked as a crew member for Rusty Wallace and at Petty Enterprises. In 1986, he made his NASCAR debut in the Winston Cup Series, driving the No. 19 Pontiac for the Zanworth Racing Team, and had a best finish of 22nd in three starts. The following year, he made his Busch Series debut at Darlington Raceway, finishing 27th in the No. 0 Hunt Tire-sponsored Oldsmobile. He did not compete in NASCAR again until 1990, when he drove the No. 13 Glidden Paints-sponsored Buick for Mansion Motorsports at North Carolina Speedway, finishing 35th with rear end failure. He ran four races for Dixon over the next two years, before running one race in 1993 for Jimmy Means.

In 1994, Skinner began racing late models for Gene Petty, and won a local track championship. He and Petty also began racing in the Busch Series in the No. 88, winning one pole in the Kentucky Fried Chicken-sponsored Chevrolet, but failing to finish a race.

Richard Childress Racing

Skinner was selected by Richard Childress Racing to drive the No. 3 GM Goodwrench-sponsored Chevrolet Silverado for the first NASCAR SuperTruck Series season. He won the first race in the series, and collected a total of eight wins, 17 Top 5 finishes, 18 Top 10 finishes, 10 poles, an average start of 3.9 and an average finish of 4.8, en route to winning the first championship. He equaled his win total the following season, but fell to third in the standings. That year, he ran five races for RCR in the Winston Cup Series, qualifying in the Top 10 three times and having a best finish of 12th in the No. 31 Realtree-sponsored car. He also filled in for teammate Dale Earnhardt when Earnhardt was recovering from injuries suffered in a wreck at Talladega, where he flipped after contact with Sterling Marlin.

In the 1997 NASCAR Winston Cup season, Skinner was promoted to full-time, driving the No. 31 with a sponsorship from Lowe's. He won poles at both of the season's races at Daytona International Speedway and had three top ten finishes. Despite failing to qualify for one race and a 30th-place points finish, he won the Rookie of the Year award. He had nine Top 10's during his sophomore season, but finished 21st in points after being forced sit out three races due to injury. He also won two exhibition races in Japan during those two seasons, when NASCAR held races in Asia for the first time. He finished no worse than sixth in the first four races of the 1999 season, and held the points lead briefly during the early portion of the season. He had a total of five Top 5 finishes, 14 Top 10 finishes, two poles, and ended the year with a career-best 10th place in the point standings. He also raced in 13 races in the Busch Series, driving the No. 19 Yellow Freight Systems-sponsored Chevy for Emerald Performance Group. He won his only career Busch Series race at Atlanta after being disqualified for a rules infraction, before NASCAR overturned its decision.

Skinner had 11 Top 10s in the 2000 season, but fell to twelfth in points and lost his crew chief Larry McReynolds, who retired from NASCAR to broadcast the series on Fox Sports.

In the 2001 season, he had only one top ten and suffered severe injuries in a wreck at Chicagoland Speedway after cutting a right-front tire and crashing head-first in turn 1. He was forced to miss the next five races because he suffered a concussion, a broken ankle, and a torn ACL in the crash. Free agent driver Robby Gordon was tapped to replace him and had a few Top 10s. Then the news broke out that Gordon would replace Skinner in the No. 31 Chevy after the 2001 season, and that Lowe's resigned from RCR to sponsor Jeff Gordon and Rick Hendrick's co-owned team for the rookie Jimmie Johnson in 2002. Skinner returned at Michigan, but after another accident at Richmond, Skinner opted for surgery to repair his ACL. He announced the next morning after the accident that he would miss the remainder of the season. In his announcement, he bid farewell to Richard Childress and his team; he also announced that Robby Gordon would replace him again and wished him luck.

Robby Gordon finished off the season with an upset victory at New Hampshire.

2002–2017 
Skinner signed on to drive the struggling No. 4 Kodak-sponsored Chevy for Morgan-McClure Motorsports in the 2002 season. During the 2001 season, the Morgan-McClure team employed several drivers and had six Top 15 finishes. In 2002, Skinner had a sixth-place finish at Rockingham but only managed three Top 15 finishes while finishing 31st in the final points standings. 
The team switched to Pontiac for the 2003 season, after Joe Gibbs Racing went to Chevrolet and picked up manufacturer support. Skinner continued to struggle. After failing to qualify for the Sirius 400 at Michigan, Skinner was released after 14 races. Later in the year, he ran four Truck Series races for Billy Ballew Motorsports and returned to the cup series to replace Jerry Nadeau in the No. 01 U.S. Army sponsored car for MBV Motorsports in 11 races. His highlight and lowlight of that car came at a weekend in Richmond, he wrecked his first car in practice after getting loose, Then, after unrolling the backup, earned the pole. After hitting oil in Happy Hour, he had to then go to a third car which was a car that was supposed to run next weekend at Loudon. He continued to run the 01 until Martinsville when Joe Nemechek went to drive the 01 to get ready for his ride in 2003. His final race of the season came at Homestead for Michael Waltrip Racing, driving the 00 Bacardi Chevrolet.

In 2004, Skinner returned to the Truck Series to become one of Toyota's main drivers following their entrance of the Tundra in the truck series. Skinner drove the No. 42 Toyota Tundra for Bang! Racing for the first 18 races. He was running ninth in points when conflicts between Toyota and Bang's owners allowed the team to split and run the No. 5 Toyota Tundra for Bill Davis Racing. He won two poles and had two Top 10s in his six races for Bill Davis Racing while finishing 11th in the final points. On the Cup side of things, Skinner returned to Childress to run the 33 Bass Pro Shops Chevy in the Daytona 500. He finished in 22nd, one lap down from winner Dale Earnhardt Jr.

In 2005, Skinner again drove the No. 5 Toyota Tundra for Bill Davis Racing. He collected seven poles and two Truck Series wins and finished fifth in points. He also ran a part-time Nextel Cup schedule, first announcing six races for Davis in the 23 car with sponsorship from Argent Mortgage, Bad Boy Mowers, and The History Channel, he qualified in five of the six races, as the other race he failed to qualify due to rain and being too low in Owner-Points. Skinner also raced in four races for R&J Motorsports in the 37 car for four races, with a best finish of 37th after some horrendous luck. He also attempted the 00 Aaron's Dream Machine for Michael Waltrip again but was collected in the Big One on Lap 19.  In 2006, Skinner again drove for Bill Davis Racing in the Truck Series. He collected eight poles and won one race while finishing 10th in points. He also ran four cup races and nine Busch series races during the year. He also failed to qualify for 10 races that year as well.

In 2007, Skinner finished second in the Craftsman Truck series point standings while driving the No. 5 Toyota Tundra for Bill Davis Racing. Skinner had a dominating year, as he won twelve poles and five races. He went into the last race of the season with a 29 point lead over Ron Hornaday Jr before having multiple tire issues and finishing in 35th place, losing the championship to Hornaday by 54 points.

In 2008, Skinner collected four poles and won one race while finishing sixth in Truck Series points. He also ran in 11 Sprint Cup races for Toyota with one race for Bill Davis Racing, three races for Michael Waltrip Racing, and seven races for Team Red Bull.  In 2009, Skinner was under contract to drive for Bill Davis Racing in the Truck Series, but the team was sold and ceased operations. On January 29, it was announced that Skinner would drive one of two trucks that Randy Moss Motorsports would field, the No. 5 Exide Batteries-sponsored Tundra. Skinner won three races and three poles and finished third in points. Skinner drove in five Cup Series races in 2009, three races in Tommy Baldwin Racing's No. 36 car that year and one race in the No. 70 Chevrolet Impala SS for TRG Motorsports.

The next season, however, would be quite different. Phillips left RMM after the 2009 season to be the crew chief for Kyle Busch Motorsports. Veteran Gene Nead initially replaced him, but Nead left the team after Charlotte, being replaced by team engineer Stacy Johnson. Their season would only go downhill from there, with Skinner grabbing only two top fives and an eight-place finish in the points. Skinner parted ways with RMM on January 19, 2011.

In 2011, Skinner attempted to qualify the No. 45 Toyota Tundra for Eddie Sharp Racing at Daytona, but failed to make the race on speed. Skinner was ineligible to use his past champion's provisional due to ESR entering the No. 45 after the entry deadline. He drove No. 60 Big Red Soda-sponsored Toyota Camry for Germain Racing in the Sprint Cup Series and also spent a few races driving the No. 32 Ford Fusion for FAS Lane Racing. He also drove for Tommy Baldwin Racing in Atlanta after medical issues forced Dave Blaney from the car.

In 2012, Skinner drove the No. 8 Eddie Sharp Racing Chevrolet in the season-opening Truck Series race at Daytona, but was involved in a crash with teammate Cale Gale and failed to finish the race. In early May, Skinner joined Hamilton Means Racing to drive the No. 52 in the Sprint Cup Series starting in the Southern 500 at Darlington Raceway. His last start was the 2012 August Michigan race. He has not raced ever since.

In 2016, Skinner starred as the test driver for the first series of the British motoring show The Grand Tour. On November 7, 2017, Skinner announced that he would not be returning for the second series of the show. He was later replaced by racing driver Abbie Eaton.

Personal life

As revealed in a SiriusXM NASCAR Radio Interview with Dave Moody, Skinner was born Michael Quick. At the age of eight, his mother left his birth father and married a rancher by the name of William "Bill" Skinner, and Mike took his name after him. He was voted class president in eighth grade. He then moved to Colorado in his late teens and worked on the oil derricks and was a manager. After getting his licence suspended in Colorado, he went back to California at the DMV to get his licence redone and then bought a 1971 Plymouth Road Runner. After crashing the car while street racing, he then ended up rebuying the car and converted it into a stock car and nearly won in his first ever race...only to showboat and crash the car, rolling several times and landing on his roof. Skinner was untouched until he kicked the car and broke his lead toe.

Skinner was married twice, first to his high school sweetheart and got married as an ultimatum but eventually divorced. Then again in 2000 to the current Angie Skinner who is also sometimes a co-host on SiriusXM Speedway. On periods of time, Mike and Angie Skinner host the "Skinner Roundup" on SiriusXM. Usually on a Sunday morning after a Cup event.

Mike has two sons from his previous marriage, Jamie and Dustin, who both appeared in NASCAR races.

Motorsports career results

NASCAR
(key) (Bold – Pole position awarded by qualifying time. Italics – Pole position earned by points standings or practice time. * – Most laps led.)

Sprint Cup Series

Daytona 500

Busch Series

Camping World Truck Series

 Ineligible for series points

ARCA Bondo/Mar-Hyde Series
(key) (Bold – Pole position awarded by qualifying time. Italics – Pole position earned by points standings or practice time. * – Most laps led.)

References

External links

 
 

Living people
1957 births
People from Susanville, California
Racing drivers from California
NASCAR drivers
NASCAR Truck Series champions
NASCAR team owners
ARCA Menards Series drivers
Richard Childress Racing drivers
Michael Waltrip Racing drivers